Matthew 28:17 is the seventeenth verse of the twenty-eighth chapter of the Gospel of Matthew in the New Testament. This verse is part of the resurrection narrative, recording a meeting of the risen Jesus with the disciples.

Content
The original Koine Greek, according to Westcott and Hort/[NA27 and UBS4 variants], reads:
17: καὶ ἰδόντες αὐτὸν προσεκύνησαν, οἱ δὲ ἐδίστασαν.

In the King James Version of the Bible it is translated as:
17: And when they saw him, they worshipped him: but some doubted.

The modern World English Bible translates the passage as:
17: When they saw him, they bowed down to him, but some doubted.

Analysis
The verse states briefly that "they saw him", then "they worshipped him", concluded by a puzzling phrase "but some doubted" (hoi de edistasan). The Greek root word for "doubted" is distazō, which is only used here and in  when Jesus rebuked Simon Peter for having "doubt" after he lost his confidence during his walk on the water toward Jesus. The "doubt" here does not denote intellectual disbelief ("refuse to believe"), but "hesitation".

The Greek word translated as "worshipped" comes from the verb , indicating 'the homage and prostration before a king'. It occurs twelve times in the Gospel of Matthew, whereas it is found only twice each in the Gospel of Mark and in the Gospel of Luke.

Notes

References

Sources
 

Matthew 28